The Best Things may refer to:

 "The Best Things", a song by Filter from the album Title of Record
 The Best Things (1998 album), a compilation album by Boom Crash Opera
 The Best Things (2013 album), a compilation album by Boom Crash Opera

See also
 The Best Thing (disambiguation)